Othneil Miles (23 September 1939 – February 1982) was a Jamaican cricketer. He played in twenty-one first-class matches for the Jamaican cricket team from 1967 to 1976.

See also
 List of Jamaican representative cricketers

References

External links
 

1939 births
1982 deaths
Jamaican cricketers
Jamaica cricketers
People from Clarendon Parish, Jamaica